Carlene King Johnson Drake (May 31, 1933 – April 15, 1969) was an American model and beauty pageant titleholder who won Miss USA 1955.

She attended Middlebury College, where she was a member of the Nu chapter Sigma Kappa sorority. She was a legacy of Sigma Kappa sorority, as her mother, Katherine King Johnson, was a member of the Alpha Kappa Chapter. She later attended the Forsyth School of Dental Hygiene at Tufts University in Boston, where she was voted Inter Fraternity Council Queen.

After winning the Miss Vermont USA crown, Johnson, from Rutland, Vermont, went on to become Vermont's only representative (as of 2021) to achieve the title of Miss USA.  Previously, she was Miss Vermont 1953.

Johnson was born to Dr. Norman and Katherine King Johnson. She had two brothers, named Lyman and Raymond E. On December 21, 1957, she wed Lawrence Drake. They divorced in April 1966. On March 21, 1968, she married Don Carroll Holloway.

She died at the age of 35 due to diabetes.

References

External links
Miss USA official website
Mention of Carlene King Johnson's death
Carlene King Johnson Holloway at Find-A-Grave

1933 births
1968 deaths
Beauty pageant contestants from Vermont
Miss America 1950s delegates
Miss Universe 1955 contestants
Miss USA winners
People from Rutland (town), Vermont
Middlebury College alumni
Tufts University School of Dental Medicine alumni
20th-century American people